De Peck-Villchen was a newspaper published in Luxembourg between 1945 and 1956.

1945 in Luxembourg
1956 in Luxembourg
Defunct newspapers published in Luxembourg
Luxembourgish-language newspapers
Newspapers established in 1945
Publications disestablished in 1956